Munkebjerg is a central-southeastern neighbourhood of  Odense, in Funen, Denmark.

References

Suburbs of Odense